is a Japanese artistic gymnast. Born in Chiba, Japan, he graduated from National Institute of Fitness and Sports in Kanoya and later join Central Sports gymnastic club. Maeno was part of Japan men's national gymnastics team that won the silver at 2018 Asian Games.

See also 
 Japan men's national gymnastics team

References

External links
 Gymnastics at the 2018 Asian Games – Men's artistic team all-around qualification
 Gymnastics at the 2018 Asian Games – Men's artistic team all-around final
 Fuya Maeno at FIG website

Japanese male artistic gymnasts
Sportspeople from Chiba Prefecture
Living people
1996 births
Gymnasts at the 2018 Asian Games
Medalists at the 2018 Asian Games
Asian Games silver medalists for Japan
Asian Games medalists in gymnastics
20th-century Japanese people
21st-century Japanese people